Boston Bears and Boston Bears (football) may refer to:

Boston Bears (AFL), team in third American Football League
Boston Bears (soccer), team in American Soccer League